Souris Glenwood Industrial Air Park  is located  east of Souris, Manitoba, Canada.

See also
RCAF Station Souris

References

Registered aerodromes in Manitoba